Portugal entered the Eurovision Song Contest 1992, held in Malmö, Sweden, with Dina with the song "Amor d'água fresca" after she won the Portuguese national final, Festival da Canção 1992. At Eurovision, she received 26 points, placing 17th in a field of 23 competing countries.

Before Eurovision

Festival da Canção 1992 
The Portuguese broadcaster, Rádio e Televisão de Portugal (RTP), used the popular Festival da Canção to select their entry for the Eurovision Song Contest 1992.

Format 
5 semi-final were held before the final, each with 3 songs. The winner of each semi-final, selected by an "expert" jury which included Adelaide Ferreira (who represented Portugal in the 1985 contest) entered the final, in which they were joined by 5 songs selected internally by RTP bringing the total number of songs to 10. The winner was decided through the votes of 22 regional juries.

Semi-finals 
All semi-finals took place at the Estúdios do Lumiar in Lisbon, hosted by Júlio Isidro.

The first semi-final was held on 12 January 1992. An "expert" jury selected the winner to entered the final. "Chão de dança" performed by Olívia was disqualified after the semi-final.

The second semi-final was held on 19 January 1992. An "expert" jury selected the winner to entered the final. "É à noite" performed by Zé Mi was disqualified after the semi-final.

The third semi-final was held on 26 January 1992. An "expert" jury selected the winner to entered the final.

The fourth semi-final was held on 2 February 1992. An "expert" jury selected the winner to entered the final.

The fifth semi-final was held on 9 February 1992. An "expert" jury selected the winner to entered the final.

Final 
The final was held on 7 March 1992 at the São Luíz Theatre in Lisbon and was hosted by Ana Zanatti and Eládio Clímaco. The winner was decided through the votes of 22 regional juries.

The winner was "Amor d'água fresca", sung by Dina and composed by Ondina Veloso (aka Dina) and Rosa Lobato de Faria

At Eurovision
Dina performed 8th on the night of the contest, following Sweden and preceding Cyprus. She received 26 points in total, placing 17th in a field of 23.

Voting

References

External links
Portuguese National Final 1992

1992
Countries in the Eurovision Song Contest 1992
Eurovision